= Megacleides =

Megacleides (Ancient Greek: Μεγακλείδης) may refer to:

- Megacleides of Eleusis, he had a dispute about some money transactions with Lycon and was also brought forward by Demosthenes as a witness in his speech against Callippus.
- Megacleides, an ancient Greek writer.
